Hanna Lindberg (28 August 1865 – 2 January 1951) was a Swedish municipal politician (liberal), feminist and milliner. She was the first woman in the Örebro city municipal council. Alongside the other women elected into various municipal councils in Sweden in the 1910 elections, she was also the first woman to be elected in a municipal council in Sweden.

Hanna Lindberg had been a Gofer and a milliner before she opened her own hat shop in 1891 and her own hat-factory, AB Lindberg Strå- & Filthattar (AB Lindberg Straw- and felthats) in 1898. She was active within the women's suffrage society, YMCA as well as the frisinnade föreningen (liberals). Being unmarried and thereby of legal majority, as well as wealthy, she had been able to vote for many years, under the voting law of 1862, before all genders became eligible to the municipal elections after the 1909 reform, and after the 1910 municipal elections, she was one of the women elected into local councils, becoming the first elected woman of her country.

Her installation in the communical council attracted attention as an historical event and was carefully described:

Hanna Lindberg sat one full term, until 1914. In the city of Örebro, two more women sat in the council before the national women suffrage: Mathilda Tengwall in 1914–1920, and Amalia Lundgren as a temporary replacement in 1916.

See also 
 Kerstin Hesselgren
 Emilia Broomé
 Gertrud Månsson

References 
 

1865 births
20th-century Swedish women politicians
20th-century Swedish politicians
Swedish feminists
1951 deaths
Milliners
19th-century Swedish businesspeople
Local politicians in Sweden
Swedish women business executives
Swedish industrialists
19th-century Swedish businesswomen